The second series of The Only Way Is Essex, a British semi-reality television programme, began airing on 20 March 2011 on ITV2. The series concluded on 4 May 2011 and consisted of fourteen episodes. This is the first series to include Carol Wright, Chloe Sims, Debbie Douglas, Frankie Essex, Gemma Collins, Joey Essex, Mick Norcross and Nicola Goodger, and briefly included Leah Wright, the cousin of Mark and Jess Wright, before she later returned in the ninth series. It is the last series to include Amy Childs. The series heavily focused on the relationship between Lauren G and Mark, where the pair celebrate an engagement, failed to win over the support from the Wright family, before splitting when Mark puts his club promoting before his fiancée. It also featured the demise of Arg and Lydia's relationship, the blossoming romance between Joey and Sam, and Kirk and Lauren P taking things to the next step despite the disapproval from her best friend Maria.

Cast

Episodes

{| class="wikitable plainrowheaders" style="width:100%; background:#fff;"
! style="background:#A9F5A9;"| SeriesNo.
! style="background:#A9F5A9;"| SeasonNo.
! style="background:#A9F5A9;"| Title
! style="background:#A9F5A9;"| Original airdate
! style="background:#A9F5A9;"| Duration
! style="background:#A9F5A9;"| UK viewers

|}

Reception

Ratings

References

The Only Way Is Essex
2011 in British television
2011 British television seasons